The 2017 UCI Para-cycling Road World Championships is the World Championships for road cycling for athletes with a physical disability. The Championships took place on the roads of Pietermaritzburg in South Africa from 31 August to 3 September 2017.

Classification

Sport class
Cycling
C1 - locomotor disability: Neurological, or amputation
C2 - Locomotor disability: Neurological, decrease in muscle strength, or amputation
C3 - Locomotor disability: Neurological, or amputation
C4 - Locomotor disability: Neurological, or amputation
C5 - Locomotor disability: Neurological, or amputation
Hand cycling 
H1 - tetraplegics with severe upper limb impairment to the C6 vertebra
H2 - Tetraplegics with minor upper limb impairment from C7 thru T3
H3 - paraplegics with impairment from T4 thru T10
H4 - Paraplegics with impairment from T11 down, and amputees unable to kneel
H5 - Athletes who can kneel on a handcycle, a category that includes paraplegics and amputees
Tricycle
T1 - Severe locomotor dysfunction
T2 - Moderate loss of stability and function
Tandem
Tandem B - Visual impairment

Event winners

Medal table

Participating nations
38 nations participated.

References

External links
Official website

UCI Para-cycling Track World Championships
UCI Para-cycling Track World Championships
UCI Para-cycling Track World Championships